This list of South Korean surnames by prevalence ranks Korean family names by population and includes homophonous Hanja characters. Data are provided by the Government of South Korea and only include family names used by more than five people (the Government of North Korea does not publish such data). This is an abridged version of the statistics. For the whole report, please refer to the link below.

List

See also 
 Culture of Korea
 Korean language
 Korean name
 List of common Chinese surnames
 List of Korean surnames

References 

Surnames
Demographics of South Korea
Surnames by prevalence